Civil War may refer to: 
Civil war, a war between organized groups within the same state or country

Armed conflicts  
 American Civil War (1861–1865)
 Chinese Civil War (intermittently 1927–1949)
 English Civil War (1642–1651)
 Finnish Civil War (1918)
 Russian Civil War (1917–1922)
 Spanish Civil War (1936–1939)

Lists of armed conflicts
 List of civil wars
 List of Roman civil wars and revolts

Film and television
 The Civil War (miniseries), a 1990 American documentary TV series
 Civil Wars (TV series), a 1991–93 American legal drama
 "Civil Wars" (The Legend of Korra), episodes of The Legend of Korra
 Captain America: Civil War, a 2016 American superhero film
 Civil War (upcoming film)

Gaming
 Civil War (board game), a 1961 board wargame 
 Civil War (1988 video game), an adaptation of the board game
 Civil War (1968 video game), an early text-based strategy video game
 The Civil War (video game), a 1995 strategy game
 The History Channel: Civil War – A Nation Divided, a 2006 video game

Music
 Civil War (band), a Swedish metal band 
 The Civil Wars, an American folk band
 The Civil Wars (album), a 2013 album by the Civil Wars
 Civil War (album), a 2008 album by Dillinger Four
 The Civil War (album), a 2003 album by Matmos
 "Civil War" (song), a song by Guns N' Roses
 The Civil War (musical) (1998)
 The Civil Wars: A Tree Is Best Measured When It Is Down, an opera by Robert Wilson

Other uses
 The former name for the rivalry between Oregon State University and the University of Oregon, used until 2019
 The former name for the annual football game between Oregon State University and the University of Oregon
 Civil War (comics), a Marvel Comics crossover storyline
Civil War II, a follow-up to the 2006 Marvel series
 Second American Civil War

See also

 List of civil wars
 Bellum civile (disambiguation)
 Chinese Civil War (disambiguation)
 First Civil War (disambiguation)
 Second Civil War (disambiguation)